Notable people with name Engelbert include:

Given name 
Engelbert, Duke of Carinthia (died 1141)
Engelbert III, Margrave of Istria (died 1173), son of Duke Engelbert
Engelbert, 8th Duke of Arenberg (1824–1875)
Engelbert I, Count of Berg (died 1189)
Engelbert II of Berg (1185 or 1186–1225), saint and Archbishop of Cologne, also known as Engelbert I
Engelbert II of the Mark (died 1328)
Engelbert III of the Marck, Archbishop of Cologne (1304–1368), Prince-Bishop of Liège 
Engelbert II of Falkenburg, Archbishop-Elector of Cologne (1261–1274)
Engelbert II of Nassau (1451–1504), Count of Nassau and Vianden
Engelbert, Count of Nevers (1462–1506)
Engelbert of Admont (ca. 1250–1331), abbot of the Benedictine monastery at Admont, Styria
Engelbert Besednjak (1894–1968), Slovene politician, lawyer and journalist
Engelbert Bockhoff (1913–2010), German soldier of World War II awarded the Knight's Cross of the Iron Cross
Engelbert Brenner (ca. 1904–1986), soloist on oboe and then English horn with the New York Philharmonic Orchestra
Engelbert Broda (1910–1983), Soviet KGB spy, physicist and chemist
Engelbert Dollfuss (1892–1934), second to last Austrian chancellor before the Anschluss
Engelbert Endrass (1911–1941), German World War II U-boat commander
Engelbert Fuchs, Austrian luger in the 1970s
Engelbert Humperdinck (composer) (1854–1921), a German composer, best known for his opera Hänsel und Gretel
Engelbert Humperdinck (singer) (born 1936), British pop singer
Engelbert Kaempfer (1651–1716), German naturalist and physician
Engelbert Lulla (born 1925), Austrian sprint canoer
Engelbert Mühlbacher (1843–1903), Austrian historian
Engelbert Röntgen (1829–1897), German-Dutch violinist
Engelbert Rugeje, Chief of Staff of the Zimbabwe National Army
Engelbert Seibertz (disambiguation), multiple people
Engelbert Sterckx (1792–1867), Archbishop of Mechelen, Belgium
Engelbert Zaschka (1895–1955), German engineer, designer and inventor

Surname 
Cathy Engelbert (born 1964), American business executive
Giovanna Battaglia Engelbert (born 1979), Italian fashion editor
Henry Engelbert (1826-1901), 19th century German-American architect
John Engelbert (born 1982), Swedish musician
Louis Engelbert, 6th Duke of Arenberg (1750–1820)

See also
Douglas Engelbart, inventor, early computer and Internet pioneer (1925–2013)
Engelbrecht which Engelbert is a variant spelling of

German masculine given names